Tough as Nails is an American reality competition television series that premiered on CBS on July 8, 2020. The show is hosted by Phil Keoghan and features contestants competing in challenges at job sites that test their toughness, with one participant eliminated in each episode. Four seasons of the series have already aired, with a fifth season renewal issued for the show in March 2022.

Format 
Twelve contestants are tested in competitions at real-world job sites with tasks that test their strength, endurance, life skills and mental toughness. Contestants compete in 6-on-6 team challenges, individual competitions, and elimination battles, referred to as 'Overtime'. Unlike other reality competitions, contestants who lose elimination challenges do not leave the game and still have the opportunity to win additional prizes during team competitions. Each team competition gives the winning team $12,000 ($2,000 per member) and earns the team that challenge's Badge of Honor. The team that has collected the most Badges of Honor by the end of the season receives an additional cash bonus of $60,000 ($10,000 per member). If both teams have the same number of Badges of Honor, then they will hold a tiebreaker.
 
In each episode, contestants compete in individual challenges in order to stay in the running for the grand prize. The lowest performers in each individual challenge are sent to Overtime, with the loser of the Overtime challenge eliminated from the individual competition (referred to in the show as 'punching out'). At the end of the season, one contestant is crowned the Tough as Nails champion and wins the grand prize of $200,000 and a Ford Super Duty truck.

Production 
On October 3, 2019, it was announced that CBS had ordered Tough as Nails with a 10-episode order. Phil Keoghan hosts the series and serves as executive producer alongside his wife, Louise. In early November, a nationwide casting search took place in the cities of St. Louis, Chicago, Detroit, New York City, Cincinnati, and Las Vegas. On April 29, 2020, it was announced that the series would premiere on July 8, 2020, later making it a two-hour premiere.

On August 12, 2020, the series was renewed for a second season, which premiered on February 10, 2021. On April 14, 2021, it was announced that the series was renewed for an additional two seasons, with the third season premiering on October 6, 2021. The series was later renewed for a fifth season on March 9, 2022. Starting with the fifth season, Canadians were eligible to apply for Tough as Nails. The fourth season premiered on January 4, 2023. The first four seasons filmed in Southern California, and the fifth season filmed in Hamilton, Ontario.

Episodes

Reception

Critical response 
Joel Keller from Decider said that the team challenges were more intriguing despite the individual challenges having more at stake.

Awards and nominations

International versions

References

External links 
 
 Production website
 

 
2020 American television series debuts
2020s American reality television series
English-language television shows
Business-related television series
Reality competition television series
CBS original programming
Television shows filmed in California
Television shows filmed in Hamilton, Ontario